Habitat is a 1997 science fiction film produced for the direct-to-video market and shown on the Sci Fi Channel. The film's message is largely one of ecological warning, mixed with science fiction elements of genetic engineering, family angst and redemption. It is the only theatrical movie filmed in Sony's early analog High Definition format. Sony donated the equipment and technical support in an attempt to popularize the format. The High Definition video was then transferred to film for release. The film won a Global Film Critics Award for Best Cinematography.

Plot
In a future where the Earth's ozone layer is severely decreased in size, the Symes family is on the run from the father's former employers and the government. Hank Symes a molecular biologist, has become so obsessed with saving the world that he has placed his entire family's lives in danger. They stop in a desert community to hide out and continue work when a terrible accident occurs that transforms Hank into a fantastic ethereal lifeform and begins changing the house into a huge botanical biosphere entity which has the ability to threaten all who enter.

Their son Andreas, however, is experiencing things from a teenager's point of view and doesn't know how he will be able to attend the local school, let alone fit in with any of the local kids as they all see him as some weirdo that just wandered into town. No matter what Andreas feels, his father is still around him, changing things for him and others and eventually even Andreas will come to see that in this strange time he is living that miracles still can happen.

Cast
 Balthazar Getty ....  Andreas Symes 
 Tchéky Karyo ....  Hank Symes 
 Alice Krige ....  Clarissa Symes 
 Kenneth Welsh ....  Coach Marlowe 
 Laura Harris ....  Deborah Marlowe 
 Brad Austin ....  Blaine 
 Christopher Heyerdahl ....  Eric Thornton (as Chris Heyerdahl) 
 Kristen Holden-Ried ....  Daryl (as Kris Holdenried) 
 Daniel Pilon ....  Strickland

References

External links
  
 
 

Largo Entertainment films
1997 direct-to-video films
English-language Canadian films
English-language Dutch films
Canadian science fiction films
Canadian direct-to-video films
1990s science fiction films
Canadian independent films
Dutch independent films
Environmental films
Films about genetic engineering
1997 films
1990s English-language films
Films directed by Rene Daalder
1990s Canadian films